Dominic Armato (born November 18, 1976) is an American voice actor, journalist and food critic. He is best known for his work on LucasArts games. His most famous role is the voice of the pirate Guybrush Threepwood in the Monkey Island series.

Career
Armato was a fan of the 1990s adventure games by LucasArts, such as the first two Monkey Island games. He joked with a friend that his ideal role would be to voice the Monkey Island protagonist, the pirate Guybrush Threepwood. Two months later, he was cast as Guybrush for The Curse of Monkey Island (1997). He has reprised the role for each of the sequels, plus the special editions of the first two games, and has also voiced characters in six Star Wars games and two Metal Gear games.

After ending his active voice-acting career in the early 2000s (with brief appearances in games), Armato has worked in the dining industry. Until 2015, Armato wrote a food-oriented blog, Skillet Doux. He was employed by The Arizona Republic as a food critic and journalist from 2015–2020.

Filmography

Television

Video games

References

External links
 
 Interview (Armato talks about being a video game fan and about landing the part of Threepwood.)

1976 births
Living people
American male bloggers
American bloggers
American male video game actors
American male voice actors
20th-century American male actors
21st-century American male actors